Bozkosh Rural District is in the Central District of Ahar County, East Azerbaijan province, Iran. At the census of 2006, its population was 4,900 in 1,063 households; there were 5,012 inhabitants in 1,251 households at the following census of 2011; and in the most recent census of 2016, the population of the rural district was 4,141 in 1,258 households. The largest of its 25 villages was Sholeh Boran, with 675 people.

References 

Ahar County

Rural Districts of East Azerbaijan Province

Populated places in East Azerbaijan Province

Populated places in Ahar County